Coxsackie may refer to:
 Town of Coxsackie, New York
 Coxsackie (village), New York, located within the town of Coxsackie
 Coxsackievirus, any of a group of 23 Coxsackie A viruses and 6 Coxsackie B viruses